Protoencrinurella is an extinct genus of trilobite in the family Pliomeridae. There is one described species in Protoencrinurella, P. maitlandi.

References

Pliomeridae
Articles created by Qbugbot